is a brackish lake located in the town of Yurihama, Tottori Prefecture in the San'in Region of Japan. It has a circumference of 12 kilometers and is separated from the Sea of Japan by a narrow coastal strip.  

Lake Tōgō was a cove in ancient Japan that gradually became separated from the sea by sedimentation to become a lake. It is now  connected to the Sea of Japan through Hashizu River, which is about 2 kilometers long. The lake has a number of hot springs on its bed and around its circumference. The area has been inhabited since prehistoric times, and the Hashizu Kofun Cluster located between the lake and the sea is believed to have belonged to the local ruling family that ruled the port during the Kofun period. Also in the area are a number of onsen resorts.

References 

Lakes of Japan
Landforms of Tottori Prefecture
Tourist attractions in Tottori Prefecture
Yurihama, Tottori